The Hunter from Kurpfalz (German: Der Jäger aus Kurpfalz) is a 1933 German comedy film directed by Carl Behr and starring Hans Adalbert Schlettow, Walter Rilla and Fritz Kampers.  It was produced by Carl Froelich and shot at the Johannisthal Studios of Tobis Film in Berlin. Location shooting took place around Neustadt in the Palatinate and the wider Rhineland area. The title references the German folk song "Ein Jäger aus Kurpfalz".

Cast
 Hans Adalbert Schlettow as Baron Axel von Hollperg, Gutsherr
 Walter Rilla as 	Baron Hans, sein Bruder, Buchhändler
 Fritz Kampers as 	Jakob Haringer, Gutsverwalter
 Karl Braun as 	Ebers, Förster auf Hollperg
 Hermann Braun as 	Jupp, Försterjunge
 Paul Henckels as Der alte Leuschner
 Edith Linn as 	Annie, seine Tochter
 Ilse Rose-Vollborn as 	Fränze, seine Tochter
 Theo Lingen as Schröder
 Eduard Bornträger	 as Franz, ein Diener

References

Bibliography 
 Aurich, Rolf & Jacobsen, Wolfgang . Theo Lingen: das Spiel mit der Maske : Biographie. Aufbau, 2008.
 Bock, Hans-Michael & Bergfelder, Tim. The Concise Cinegraph: Encyclopaedia of German Cinema. Berghahn Books, 2009.
 Klaus, Ulrich J. Deutsche Tonfilme: Jahrgang 1933. Klaus-Archiv, 1988.

External links

Films of Nazi Germany
German comedy films
1933 comedy films
1930s German-language films
German black-and-white films
1930s German films
Films shot at Johannisthal Studios
Tobis Film films